The École supérieure d'ingénieurs en technologies innovantes (ESITech) is a French engineering College created in 2014.

The school trains engineers in biological engineering and physical engineering.

Located in Saint-Étienne-du-Rouvray, close to Rouen, the ESITech is a public higher education institution. The school is a member of the University of Rouen Normandy and the Groupe INSA.

References

External links
 ESITech
 Groupe INSA
 BDE ESITech

Engineering universities and colleges in France
Rouen
ESITech
Educational institutions established in 2014
2014 establishments in France